StreamWatch is an environmental monitoring program focused on the  Rivanna River watershed in central Virginia in the United States. The data StreamWatch collects helps communities in the city of Charlottesville and in Albemarle, Fluvanna, and Greene Counties maintain healthy streams and restore damaged ones. StreamWatch believes that "when diverse sectors of the community share fundamental agreement on the condition of a resource, the chances of sound, collaborative management are enhanced."

About
Founded in 2002 as a joint project of The Nature Conservancy, the Rivanna Conservation Society, the Thomas Jefferson Soil and Water Conservation District, the  Rivanna River Basin Commission and the Thomas Jefferson Planning District Commission, StreamWatch continues to be administered and financed by nongovernmental and governmental organizations. Conservation groups, local governments, and natural resources agencies use StreamWatch data to gauge stream conditions and to inform planning and environmental management decisions.

Volunteers
A cadre of approximately 70 trained volunteers monitors stream conditions at representative sites throughout the watershed. Benthic invertebrate (see bioindicator), sedimentation, stream habitat, and other types of data are collected by volunteers and professionals using established scientific protocols. StreamWatch tracks land-use data, including data about agriculture, forestry, and residential and commercial development. Fieldwork, interpretation, and reporting are guided by a technical advisory committee composed of academic and resource agency scientists. StreamWatch also compiles Rivanna watershed data collected by other organizations.

Data Collection
Beginning in spring 2007, StreamWatch set out to study relationships between land use, stream habitat, and stream biology in the Rivanna River watershed. More than 120 volunteers, interns, environmental professionals, and academics helped gather, manage, and analyze data from 51 sites and their watersheds.

Footnotes

References 
Albemarle County, Virginia. "Local Volunteer-supported Program Reports on Stream Conditions in Albemarle County Development Areas."  4/1/2005  
Borden, Jeremy.  "Report: Population density affects Rivanna watershed." The Daily Progress.  10/13/2006. Reprinted by StreamWatch, courtesy of Media General.
Fluvanna County, Virginia. Fluvanna County Comprehensive Plan 3/18,2009 
Shulleeta, Brandon.  "Rivanna River watershed fails watchdog's standards."  The Daily Progress.  7/24/2008 
Virginia Department of Environmental Quality.  2008 Citizen/Non-Agency Monitoring Activity Report 
Virginia Department of Environmental Quality.  2008. Benthic TMDL Development for the Rivanna River Watershed 
Whitehead, Jason. "Let it flow."  C'ville.  5/8/2007

External links 
Stream2Watch
A Tale of Two Streams -- Stream health video by The Daily Progress

Chesapeake Bay watershed
Nature conservation organizations based in the United States
Albemarle County
Charlottesville, Virginia
Water organizations in the United States
Environmental organizations based in Virginia